Noor Muhammad Jadmani is Pakistani politician, the Ambassador to Japan, his tenure ended in 2012.

Career

Noor joined the Ministry of Foreign Affairs of Pakistan in 1980. He has also worked as a representative of the United Nations in locations such as Kathmandu, Brussels, and Los Angeles.

Noor previously served as the Consul General of Pakistan, Los Angeles, since September 2003. He served as Counselor to the Embassy of Pakistan in Belgium from 2001 to 2003. He also served with the United Nations Transitional Administration in East Timor. In Islamabad, Consul General Jadmani held a range of high-ranking positions in the Ministry of Foreign Affairs, serving as Director of the Ministry from 1997 to 2000. Other postings have included Pakistan Permanent Mission to the United Nations and the Pakistani Embassy in Oman. Ambassador Jadmani joined the Foreign Service in 1980.
On April 1, 2017, Mr Noor Muhammad Jamdani appointed as Chairman Sindh Public Service Commission (SPSC). He took the charge with effect from April 3, 2017.

References

External links
Embassy of Pakistan in Japan

Living people
Ambassadors of Pakistan to Japan
1955 births